Anthaenantia villosa is a species of grass known by the common name green silkyscale. It is native to the southeastern United States as far west as Texas.

This perennial grass grows up to 4 feet tall. The leaves are up to 12 centimeters long and are lined with silky hairs along the edges. The inflorescence is a pale green panicle with hairy spikelets.

This grass is attractive to cattle and may be part of a forage mix. It is "an indicator of good range condition".

References

External links
Nature Serve

Panicoideae
Grasses of Alabama